Marcus Pürk (born 21 September 1974) is an Austrian former professional footballer who played as a midfielder.

Club career
Born in Vienna, Pürk made his professional league debut for Austria Wien in the 1992–93 season but he moved to city rivals Rapid Wien for a very successful 1994–95 season in which he was the country's highest native goalscorer (with Mario Haas and Thomas Janeschitz), he won his first cap and he was chosen Footballer of the Year by his fellow players. It earned him a move to Spanish outfit Real Sociedad only to return to Austria and join Sturm Graz a year later. He also had one season at Sturm, then rejoined Rapid for another two and sealed a second move abroad when he signed for German Bundesliga side TSV 1860 Munich. He returned to Austria in 2004 but only played one match for Admira Wacker Mödling and then went on to play at lower league sides.

International career
Pürk made his debut for the Austria national team in April 1995. He replaced Herfried Sabitzer in the 69th minute of the UEFA Euro 1996 qualifier against Liechtenstein before scoring in the 84th minute of the 7−0 victory at Stadion Lehen in Salzburg. He earned a second cap in August 2002 when he featured in the friendly against Switzerland at St. Jakob-Park in Basel.

Career statistics

Honours
Rapid Wien
 Austrian Cup: 1994–95

Sturm Graz
 Austrian Cup: 1996–97

References

External links
 Marcus Pürk at Austria Archive 
 Marcus Pürk at Rapid Archive 
 
 Marcus Pürk at Fussballportal 

1974 births
Living people
Austrian footballers
Association football midfielders
Austria international footballers
Austrian Football Bundesliga players
La Liga players
Bundesliga players
FK Austria Wien players
SK Rapid Wien players
Real Sociedad footballers
SK Sturm Graz players
TSV 1860 Munich players
FC Admira Wacker Mödling players
First Vienna FC players
SV Stockerau players
Austrian expatriate sportspeople in Spain
Expatriate footballers in Spain
Austrian expatriate sportspeople in Germany
Expatriate footballers in Germany